The sixth season of British science fiction television series Doctor Who began on 10 August 1968 with the first story of season 6 The Dominators and ended Patrick Troughton's reign as the Doctor with its final story The War Games. Only 37 out of 44 episodes are held in the BBC archives; 7 remain missing. As a result, 2 serials are incomplete: only episode 2 of the 6-part story The Space Pirates still exists, while The Invasion has had its two missing episodes (episodes 1 and 4) reconstructed using animation.

Casting

Main cast 
 Patrick Troughton as the Second Doctor
 Frazer Hines as Jamie McCrimmon
 Wendy Padbury as Zoe Heriot

Patrick Troughton, Frazer Hines and Wendy Padbury make their final regular appearances as the Second Doctor, Jamie McCrimmon and Zoe Heriot respectively. Troughton and his fellow actors collectively decided that the workload of Doctor Who was exhausting them, and that they would soon depart from the show. From Season 7 onwards the show would never have such a high number of episodes again. The three actors remained with the show until the conclusion of the final season six serial The War Games.

Troughton reprised his role in three subsequent special stories, one of which also featured Hines.

Guest stars
Nicholas Courtney reappears as Brigadier Lethbridge-Stewart in The Invasion, last seen (as a Colonel) in The Web of Fear. He would soon make regular appearances in the program beginning with season 7's Spearhead from Space.

John Levene makes his first appearance as Corporal Benton in The Invasion. He would continue to make regular appearances, with the character promoted to sergeant, from season 7 until season 13.

Alan Bennion makes his first of three appearances in the series playing an Ice Warrior. In this, his first appearance, he portrays Lord Slaar in The Seeds of Death.

Serials 

Terrance Dicks took over from Derrick Sherwin as script editor from The Invasion, with Sherwin resuming the role for The Space Pirates. Derrick Sherwin took over as producer from Peter Bryant for The War Games.

Season 6 is the most complete of all the Second Doctor's seasons, with only seven episodes missing (compared with twenty-eight from Season 4 and eighteen from Season 5), none of the season's stories missing in their entirety and only two stories (The Invasion and The Space Pirates) incomplete. This compares to the first two seasons of the Second Doctor from which only two complete serials (The Tomb of the Cybermen and The Enemy of the World) survive. The missing two episodes of The Invasion have since been reconstructed using animation and released on DVD.

The War Games, which was the final serial of the season, and the last of Patrick Troughton's tenure as the Doctor, was also the second longest serial up to that point, spanning 10 episodes – only the 12-part serial The Daleks' Master Plan from Season 3 was longer. Both of these would be beaten in 1986 by the 14-part season-spanning story The Trial of a Time Lord

The Dominators and The Mind Robber were both produced at the end of the fifth recording block and held over to Season 6.

: Episode is missing

Missing episodes 

The Invasion – Episodes 1 & 4 (of 8 total) (Animated recreations exist)
The Space Pirates – Episodes 1, 3 – 6 (of 6 total)

Home media

VHS releases

Betamax releases

DVD and Blu-ray releases

In print

Notes

References

Bibliography 

 
 
 

1968 British television seasons
1969 British television seasons
Season 06
Season 06
6
Black-and-white British television shows